Samdrupcholing, formerly known as Bhangtar,  is a rural town, Yenlag Thromde, in the southeast of Bhutan. It is located in Samdrup Jongkhar District, close to the border with India.

References

Armington, S. (2002) Bhutan. (2nd ed.) Melbourne: Lonely Planet.

Populated places in Bhutan